Hunter Dean Azure (born March 2, 1992) is an American professional mixed martial artist who competed in the bantamweight division of the Ultimate Fighting Championship (UFC).

Background 
Azure was born on the Fort Peck Indian Reservation in Poplar, Montana, and went on to attend Poplar High School, where he was a four-time Class-B MHSA state  champion as a wrestler. He then wrestled at the Montana State University–Northern, where he earned a degree in industrial technology.

Mixed martial arts career

Early career
Azure spent most of his early career in regional Western American promotions, most notably fighting in the Legacy Fighting Alliance. During this time he compiled an undefeated 6–0 record.

Dana White's Contender Series

He was eventually invited to the Dana White's Contender Series 19. On July 9, 2019, he faced fellow undefeated prospect Chris Ocon, defeating him via unanimous decision and in the process gaining a UFC contract.

Ultimate Fighting Championship 
Azure made his promotional debut against Brad Katona on September 14, 2019, at UFC Fight Night: Cowboy vs. Gaethje. He won the bout by unanimous decision.

Azure was scheduled to face Umar Nurmagomedov on April 18, 2020, at UFC 249. However, the event was then postponed.

Azure faced Brian Kelleher on May 13, 2020, at UFC Fight Night: Smith vs. Teixeira. He lost the fight via knockout in the second round. This bout earned both participants the Fight of the Night award.

Azure faced Cole Smith on September 5, 2020, at UFC Fight Night: Overeem vs. Sakai. He won by unanimous decision.

Azure faced Jack Shore on April 10, 2021, at UFC on ABC: Vettori vs. Holland. He lost the bout via split decision.

On March 1, 2022, it was announced that Azure was released from UFC.

Post UFC 
Azure made his first appearance post release at iKON FC 2 on March 18, 2022, against Keith Richardson. He lost the bout via rear-naked choke in the second round.

Azure returned in October to face Ben Hollier at Fusion Fight League: Boise, winning the bout via unanimous decision.

Personal life
Hunter and his fiancée Sage have a son, Wilder (born 2020). He is the son of Howard and Deb Azure and has three siblings: Dustyn, Autumn, and Ashley. He is a native American, being an enrolled member of the Assiniboine and Sioux people on the Fort Peck Indian Reservation.

Championships and accomplishments

Mixed martial arts
Ultimate Fighting Championship
Fight of the Night (one time)

Mixed martial arts record

|-
|Win
|align=center|10–3
|Ben Hollier
|Decision (unanimous)
|Fusion Fight League: Boise
|
|align=center|3
|align=center|5:00
|Boise, Idaho, United States
|
|-
|Loss
|align=center|9–3
|Keith Richardson
|Submission (rear-naked choke)
|iKON FC 2
|
|align=center|2
|align=center|2:05
|Miami, Florida, United States
|
|-
| Loss
| align=center|9–2
|Jack Shore
|Decision (split)
|UFC on ABC: Vettori vs. Holland
|
|align=center|3
|align=center|5:00
|Las Vegas, Nevada, United States
|
|-
| Win
| align=center|9–1
| Cole Smith
| Decision (unanimous)
| UFC Fight Night: Overeem vs. Sakai
| 
| align=center|3
| align=center|5:00
| Las Vegas, Nevada, United States
|
|-
| Loss
| align=center| 8–1
| Brian Kelleher
|KO (punches)
|UFC Fight Night: Smith vs. Teixeira
|
|align=center|2
|align=center|3:40
|Jacksonville, Florida, United States
|
|-
| Win
| align=center| 8–0
| Brad Katona
| Decision (unanimous)
| UFC Fight Night: Cowboy vs. Gaethje
| 
| align=center|3
| align=center|5:00
| Vancouver, British Columbia, Canada
| 
|-
| Win
| align=center| 7–0
| Chris Ocon
| Decision (unanimous)
| Dana White's Contender Series 19
| 
| align=center| 3
| align=center| 5:00
| Las Vegas, Nevada, United States
| 
|-
| Win
| align=center| 6–0
| LJ Schulz
| Decision (unanimous)
| LFA 66
| 
| align=center| 3
| align=center| 5:00
| West Valley City, Utah, United States
| 
|-
| Win
| align=center| 5–0
| Jaime Hernandez
| TKO (kick to the body and punches)
| LFA 59
| 
| align=center| 1
| align=center| 2:15
| Phoenix, Arizona, United States
| 
|-
| Win
| align=center| 4–0
| A.J. Robb
| Decision (unanimous)
| LFA 53
| 
| align=center| 3
| align=center| 5:00
| Phoenix, Arizona, United States
|
|-
| Win
| align=center| 3–0
| Cameron Thurgood
| TKO (punches)
| Golden Fights: Cage Wars 33
| 
| align=center| 1
| align=center| 1:01
| Grand Junction, Colorado, United States
|
|-
| Win
| align=center|2–0
| Joshua Sandvig
| Submission (rear-naked choke)
| Fusion Fight League: Lights Out at the Dome 2
| 
| align=center|2
| align=center|4:49
| Havre, Montana, United States
|
|-
| Win
| align=center| 1–0
| Jon Lorens
| TKO (punches)
| Jeremy Horn's Elite Fight Night 29
| 
| align=center| 1
| align=center| 2:08
| Ogden, Utah, United States
|
|-

See also

 List of male mixed martial artists

References

External links

1992 births
Living people
21st-century Native Americans
American male mixed martial artists
Bantamweight mixed martial artists
Mixed martial artists utilizing collegiate wrestling
Mixed martial artists from Montana
American male sport wrestlers
Amateur wrestlers
Native American sportspeople
People from Poplar, Montana
Fort Peck Assiniboine and Sioux Tribes people
Ultimate Fighting Championship male fighters
Montana State University–Northern alumni